Gurbănești is a commune in Călărași County, Muntenia, Romania. It is composed of six villages: Codreni, Coțofanca, Gurbănești, Preasna, Preasna Veche and Valea Presnei.

References

Communes in Călărași County
Localities in Muntenia